Asbjørn Wang (28 September 1899 – 16 January 1966) was a Norwegian sport swimmer.

He was born in Kristiania. He competed at the 1920 Summer Olympics, where he reached the semifinals in 100 metre backstroke. He placed fourth in his heat in the semifinal, but did not qualify for the final.

References

External links

1899 births
1966 deaths
Sportspeople from Oslo
Norwegian male backstroke swimmers
Olympic swimmers of Norway
Swimmers at the 1920 Summer Olympics
20th-century Norwegian people